"Headbone Connected (Try Me)" is a song recorded by Dutch eurodance artist Daisy Dee. It was released in November 1994 as a single. A CD maxi with new remixes was also available, but it was marketed at the same time as the other media. The song was a hit in Canada, where it topped the RPM Dance Chart for 2 weeks in mid-1995.

Track listings
 CD Maxi-single (Europe, 1995)
 "Headbone Connected (Try Me)" (Euro Radio) - 3:42
 "Headbone Connected (Try Me)" (Euro Mix) - 5:38 
 "Headbone Connected (Try Me)" (Pegasus Vocal Mix) - 5:52
 "Headbone Connected (Try Me)" (Pegasus Dub) - 5:03
 "Headbone Connected (Try Me)" (Miami By Night Mix) - 6:01 
 "Headbone Connected (Try Me)" (Miami 5 A.M. Mix) - 5:48 
 "Headbone Connected (Try Me)" (Ocean Drive Dub) - 6:20 
 "Headbone Connected (Try Me)" (Piano Mix) - 5:56 
 "Headbone Connected (Try Me)" (Dub Part 1 & 2) - 8:23

Chart performance

See also
"Dem Bones" or "Dry Bones", the spiritual that presumably inspired the title lyric.

References

1995 singles
Daisy Dee songs
1995 songs